Nicolae Cambrea (5 April 1899 – 5 February 1976) was a Romanian brigadier general during World War II. 

He was born in Târgu Jiu, Gorj County, the son of the city's Police chief. After his father's death in 1916, during the German occupation of Târgu Jiu in World War I, he volunteered to serve in the Romanian Army. He remained in the army after the war, advancing in rank as officer. In 1942, he served as Chief of Staff 5th Division. He was briefly a Soviet prisoner-of-war, but the following year joined his captors and became General Officer Commanding of the Tudor Vladimirescu Division, which earned him the nickname "Red General".

After the war he was Vice Chief General Staff in 1945, Deputy General Officer Commanding 2nd Military Region in 1947, Commandant Army Instruction Center in 1948, and General Officer Commanding 3rd Military Region in 1949. Cambrea retired in 1950.

References

1899 births
1976 deaths
People from Târgu Jiu
Romanian Land Forces generals
Romanian military personnel of World War II
Romanian prisoners of war
World War II prisoners of war held by the Soviet Union
Tudor Vladimirescu Division personnel
Romanian communists
Romanian military personnel of World War I
Recipients of the Order of Alexander Nevsky
Knights of the Order of the Star of Romania
Collaborators with the Soviet Union